The Smash: 20th Anniversary Tour (also known as the Smash Anniversary Tour) was a concert tour by American rock band The Offspring, which celebrated the 20th anniversary of the band's third album Smash. The trek began on May 3, 2014 in Belgium, and wrapped up on September 13, 2014 in Sacramento.

Background
The possibility of a Smash anniversary tour was mentioned in August 2012 by frontman Dexter Holland. In regards to the possibility, guitarist Noodles stated, "When it's 20 years of Smash, it's also 25 years of our first record. So, I don't know, we're going to have to do both of those back to back. I don't know, we'll see. That's only two years from now."

The Smash anniversary tour was announced on The Offspring's official website on April 8, 2014, the 20th anniversary of the album's original release date. On each date, the band played the Smash album in its entirety. To coincide with the anniversary, The Offspring released a special edition of Smash in mid-August on Epitaph Records, and toured to promote it. On May 12, 2014, it was announced that The Offspring would embark on the Summer Nationals 2014 tour from July to September, supporting their former labelmates Bad Religion and Pennywise as well as The Vandals, Stiff Little Fingers and Naked Raygun. To coincide with the Summer Nationals tour, The Offspring released cover versions of Pennywise's "No Reason Why", and Bad Religion's "Do What You Want" and "No Control" on their YouTube account.

Tour dates

References

External links
The Offspring's official website
The Offspring touring history

2014 concert tours
The Offspring concert tours